Kostadin Todorov Kostadinov (born 1 April 1979) is a Bulgarian politician. He is the chairman of the ultranationalist Revival party (Vazrazhdane).

Kostadinov is known for his anti-NATO stances, as well as for his anti-Roma and anti-migrant views and аnti-Macedonian views..

Biography 

Throughout the years Kostadin has been engaged with the historical Bulgarian communities in Moldova, Ukraine, Greece, Romania, Serbia, North Macedonia, Albania, and others, and is the author of several books and documentaries about them.

He completed his master's degree in Balkan studies in 2002 and his master's in Law in 2011 at  Veliko Tarnovo University. In 2017 Kostadin completed his Ph.D. in Ethnography and Folklore in the Ethnographic Museum of the Bulgarian Academy of Sciences. In 2004 he filmed a documentary on the Bulgarians in Albania, and in 2005 published the film 'We are one nation' – directed to the Bulgarians in Aegean Macedonia. He is also the author of the film 'Forgotten Land', devoted to the Bulgarians in North Dobrudja, filmed in 2009.

In 2016, disappointed by what he perceived as falsifications and forgeries of Bulgarian history in contemporary Bulgarian textbooks – he wrote a 'History Textbook' aimed at children from grades 1st through 4th.

In 2017, he released his next book, 'Guide to the ancient Bulgarian lands' in which over 100 revered places of Bulgarian history are named and detailed.

In 2018 Kostadin Kostadinov divorced his wife Velina, with whom he has fathered one child. They had been married since 2003.

Political career 
During his political career, Kostadinov has sided with different far-right formations. In 2014, he founded the Revival party.

IMRO-BNM 
In 1997 Kostadin became a member of IMRO – Bulgarian National Movement and its coordinator for Northeast Bulgaria (2002–2009). He was regional coordinator of VMRO-BNM in the provinces of Varna, Shumen, and Dobrich from 2002 to 2009, and from 2007 through 2012 he was a member of the National Executive Committee of IMRO-BNM. In 2013 he left the party because of the re-election of its leader – Krasimir Karakachanov, and in the same year ran as a member of the also nationalistic NFSB party.

Revival party
He participated in the founding of the far-right Revival in Bulgaria in June 2014. The constituent assembly took place in Pliska.

On 3 November 2019, Kostadinov and Revival went on a run-off vote for the mayor position in Varna (the 3rd largest city in Bulgaria) and accumulated 14.3% in the first round of voting and 35.99% in the runoffs.

Revival gathered 2.45% support at the April 2021 parliamentary election, remaining below the 4.0% needed for entry into the parliament. In the July 2021 parliamentary election it gathered 2.97%. In the 2021 general election Revival gathered 4.86% and entered the parliament gaining 13 seats.

Controversy 
Kostadin has garnered much controversy around his negative views on ethnic minorities and the LGBT community. He is also known for his pro-Russian sentiment and has called for physical assaults on people who do not conform to his views, calling them names like "rabble" and "stupid scum" who should be "put down like dangerous animals".

Kostadinov has also exposed strong anti-Roma views, describing Roma people as "parasites" and "non-human vermin that has no place in Bulgaria".

In the summer of 2020, the Court in Sofia launched a procedure for the removal of "Revival" as a political party, on the grounds that it had been fraudulently established through gathering falsified signatures. However, in May 2021, the Supreme Court of Cassation ruled in favor of Kostadinov's party, establishing that there had been no irregularities. In September 2020, Kostadinov was detained by the police during the protests opposing chief prosecutor Ivan Geshev and Borisov's administration. His party has also been noted for its opposition to many of the pandemic control measures, the  promotion of conspiracy theories and its strong reservations regarding the COVID-19 vaccines. In March 2022, it was revealed that Kostadinov had received a 10-year ban from entering Ukraine, which has been attributed to the staunchly pro-Russian orientation of his party in the context of the 2022 Russian invasion of Ukraine.

References

External links 
 

1979 births
Living people
Politicians from Varna, Bulgaria
Bulgarian nationalists
Conspiracy theorists
Bulgarian propagandists
Anti-Americanism
Anti-Western sentiment
Pro-Russian people of the war in Donbas
Bulgarian eurosceptics
Anti-vaccination activists
COVID-19 conspiracy theorists